The Arcetri Observatory is an astrophysical observatory located in the hilly area of Arcetri on the outskirts of Florence, Italy. It is located close to Villa Il Gioiello, the residence of Galileo Galilei from 1631 to 1642. Observatory staff carry out theoretical and observational astronomy as well as designing and constructing astronomical instrumentation. The observatory has been heavily involved with the following instrumentation projects:

 The MMT 6.5 m telescope
 The LBT 2x 8.4 m telescopes
 The Telescopio Nazionale Galileo 3.5 m telescope
 The VLT telescope adaptive secondary mirror
 The 1.5 m Gornergrat Infrared Telescope (TIRGO)

See also
List of solar telescopes

External links
 Osservatorio Astrofisico di Arcetri English website
 The observatory on Google maps

Arcetri
Arcetri
Buildings and structures in Florence